Xavier Fernique (3 May 1934  – 15 March 2020) was a mathematician, noted mostly for his contributions to the theory of stochastic processes.  Fernique's theorem, a result on the integrability of Gaussian measures, is named after him.

External links
 
 Photograph, courtesy of the Mathematical Research Institute of Oberwolfach

20th-century French mathematicians
French statisticians